No Trespassing is the nineteenth studio album by American rapper Too Short. It was released on February 28, 2012, under Dangerous Music, owned by Too Short. The album's production was handled by Vincent VT Tolan, Exclusive, DJ Klypso, and various others with guest features from 50 Cent, E-40, Kokane and Snoop Dogg.

Background
The album was backed by the lead single "Money on the Floor", which features Bay Area friend and ex-Label Mate, E-40. After the video release $hort revealed the cover of the album, that features his face over plates of the warning of No Trespassing, and after few days the track list was revealed to the public.

Music videos were also released for "I Got Caught" featuring Martin Luther, "Playa Fo Life" featuring Dom Kennedy and Beeda Weeda, "Hey" featuring Silk-E, "Hog Ridin'" featuring Richie Rich, "Double Header" featuring Wallpaper, and "Trying to Come Up" featuring C.O.

Commercial performance
The album debuted at number 129 on the Billboard 200 with first-week sales of 5,000 copies in the United States.

Track listing

Notes
Sir Michael Rocks is not credited on "Trying to Come Up", his verse only appear in the song's music video.

References

2012 albums
Too Short albums
Albums produced by Lil Jon